Ben Crouse (born ) is a South African rugby union referee on the National A Panel of the South African Rugby Union.

References

Living people
South African rugby union referees
1983 births